Kim Hwa-song  (born 19 August 1985,) is a former North Korean women's international footballer who plays as a defender. She is a member of the North Korea women's national football team. She was part of the team at the 2003 FIFA Women's World Cup.

References

1985 births
Living people
North Korean women's footballers
North Korea women's international footballers
Place of birth missing (living people)
2003 FIFA Women's World Cup players
Women's association football defenders
21st-century North Korean women